The 1975–76 Western Michigan Broncos men's basketball team was a National Collegiate Athletic Association (NCAA) Division I college basketball team that played in the Mid-American Conference (MAC).  The Broncos, representing Western Michigan University (WMU), finished the season 25–3 overall and 15–1 in the conference, won the MAC championship and reached the Sweet Sixteen of the 1976 NCAA Men's Division I Basketball Tournament. They finished the season ranked No. 10 in the AP Poll and No. 19 in the UPI Poll.

Season
The Broncos were featured in a Sports Illustrated article in the February 9, 1976, issue.
After starting the season 16–0, the Broncos entered the AP Poll as the No. 17-ranked team. In the MAC showdown against Miami in Kalamazoo, a Western Michigan University (WMU) record 10,519 fans attended the game.

In an early-season game, WMU beat  (UWGB) 51–50 on a put-back by Jeff Tyson with one second left on the clock. The Broncos led by 10 points early in the second half, but UWGB took the lead by one point with 10 seconds remaining. After a timeout, WMU missed a long 25-foot field goal, but Tyson was able to get the rebound and score.

NCAA tournament
In the NCAA tournament, Western Michigan defeated  77–67 in overtime. They lost to No. 2-ranked Marquette in the Sweet Sixteen by 5 points, 62–57.

Roster
The following players were on the 1975–76 team:
 Dave Carnegie
 Rod Curry
 Tom Cutter
 Dale DeBruin
 Paul Griffin
 Jimmie Harvey
 Jim Kurzen
 Marty Murray
 Bob Pyykkonen
 Herman Randle
 Mark Rayner
 Mike Reardon
 Dave Roland
 S. L. Sales
 Marc Throop
 Jeff Tyson

The team was coached by Eldon Miller, along with assistant coaches Dick Shilts and Rich Walker.

Schedule
The Broncos finished the season 25–3 and first place in the MAC with a 15–1 record.

Statistics
The following table lists the individual player statistics for the season.

Rankings

References

External links
 Western Michigan University men's basketball media guide 

Western Michigan
Western Michigan
Western Michigan Broncos men's basketball seasons